The nickname Slammin' Sammy can refer to :

Sam Snead (1912–2002), American golfer
Sammy Sosa (born 1968), Dominican Republican baseball player
Sammy Swindell (born 1955),  American race car driver
Samuel Dalembert (born 1981) Haitian basketball player
Sammy Miller (1945–2002), American race car driver